Christophe Prazuck (born 11 October 1960) is a French naval officer. He was promoted to amiral and appointed the Chief of Staff of the French Navy on 13 July 2016.

Early life and first assignments
The son of Amiral Stéphane Prazuck, Christophe Prazuck entered to the École Navale in September 1979. After the application school on the Jeanne d'Arc, he was assigned from 1982 to 1984 on the patroller Altaïr then on the Amphibious disembarking transport ship Champlain, based at the Réunion. He remained primarily in the zone around the Indian Ocean until his next posting as second commanding officer of the patroller Épée in Mayotte.

From 1984 to 1989, Prazuck joined the Submarine Forces, serving first on the Ouessant, then on the Doris as an operations officer; he was then an officer marked «armes» at the commission of practical studies.

From 1989 to 1991, Prazuck was a candidate at the United States Naval Postgraduate School at Monterey, California, where he obtained a Doctor of Philosophy in Physical oceanography (Physical behavior study of the oceans). Following that formation, he directed naval environmental cell of Toulouse.

Senior naval career

Commands
In 1994, Prazuck became second in command of the command and supply ship Var, before assuming command of the amphibious ship Camplain the following year.

In 1996, Prazuck integrated the Inter-arm Defense College (École de guerre), and became chief of the operations group (CGO) on board the anti-submarine frigate Tourville. In 1999, he assumed command of the Floréal based in Reunion.

Public relations
In 2000, Prazuck joined the Information Service and Public Relations of the Armies – Marine (SIRPA – Marine) where he exercised the function of second in command, before assuming the lead role in 2001 for a period of three years. In 2004, he was placed at the head of the Media department of Communication and Information Defense Delegation (DICoD), then in 2006, he became the communication counselor of the Chief of the general staff headquarters of the Armies CEMA.

General officer
On 1 August 2009, Prazuck was nominated to the rank of contre-amiral (Counter-Admiral) and assumed, in August 2010, the commandment of Maritime Force of the Fusiliers Marins and Commandos (FORFUSCO) in Lorient.

Promoted to vice-amiral d’escadre (Squadron vice-admiral), he became, in August 2010, the director of military personnel of the French Navy and deputy chief of the general staff headquarters – Human resources – of the general staff headquarters of the French Navy.

By a Ministerial Council Decree decision on 6 July 2016, Prazuck was designated as Chief of Staff of the French Navy and was elevated to the rank designation of amiral, as of 12 July, by replacing Amiral Bernard Rogel, who had been promoted to Chief of the Military Staff of the President of the Republic.

Decorations and medals

French Parachutist Badge
Commander of the Order of the Légion d'honneur (2015)
Knight of the  National Order of Merit
Commander of the Ordre du Mérite Maritime
National Defence Medal (silver degree)
French commemorative medal
NATO Medal for ex-Yugoslavia
Commander's Cross Order pro Merito Melitensi, military version (Sovereign Military Order of Malta)
Order of Naval Merit, Grand Officer (Brazil)
Order of Merit "Tamanduré" (Brazil)
Unidentified award
Honorary Officer of the Order of Australia (Australia) – For distinguished service to developing the defence relationship between Australia and France through commitment, leadership and strategic foresight as Chief of Staff of the French Navy.
Order of Merit of the Italian Republic, Commander

See also
Chief of the General Staff Headquarters of the Armies (French: Chef d'État-Major des Armées, CEMA) (official designation)
Édouard Guillaud
List of submarines of France
Pierre-François Forissier

Notes and references

1960 births
Chiefs of Staff of the French Navy
Commandeurs of the Légion d'honneur
Commanders of the Ordre du Mérite Maritime
Honorary Officers of the Order of Australia
Knights of the Ordre national du Mérite
Recipients of the Order of Naval Merit (Brazil)
Commanders of the Order of Merit of the Italian Republic
Recipients of the Order pro Merito Melitensi
École Navale alumni
Living people
People from Oran